

Offseason
The WHA awarded a franchise to Los Angeles and it was originally called the "Los Angeles Aces," while the San Francisco franchise was called the Sharks. However, when funding fell through and the San Francisco franchise was then moved to Quebec to become the Nordiques, the Los Angeles group took the name Sharks and created the stylized menacing shark logo. The team colors of red and black were based on the original nickname "aces", being that the two colors in a deck of cards are red and black.

Regular season
The Sharks hung around the .500 mark for much of the season. The Winnipeg Jets, led by Bobby Hull, were clearly the class of the WHA's Western Division. Four teams (the Houston Aeros, Minnesota Fighting Saints, Alberta Oilers, and Sharks staged a season long see-saw battle for 2nd through 5th place, with only the top four making the playoffs (The Chicago Cougars finished in a distant 6th place).

The Sharks strength was their defense, which ranked 3rd in the league. Bart Crashley, Gerry Odrowski, and Jim Watson anchored the blue line. George Gardner (GAA 3.30) was a capable #1 goalie for the first half of the season, while 32-year-old rookie Russ Gillow (2.91 GAA) took over the top spot for most of the second half. In fact, Gillow was second in the WHA to Gerry Cheevers in GAA.

The offense had quality but lacked depth. It was led by 43 goal scorer Gary Veneruzzo while Alton White was 2nd on the team in goals with 20. Veneruzzo also led the team in points with 73, followed by playmaking center J.P. LeBlanc (19 goals and 50 assists for 69 points), and defenseman Bart Crashley, who anchored the power play and chipped in 18 goals and 27 assists.

Sharks special teams were solid, ranking 4th in the league in power play and 5th in penalty killing.

Ultimately, the Sharks went 6–3–1 in their last 10 games, including winning their last two to climb from 5th place to 3rd.

Final standings

Game log

Playoffs
The Sharks' 3rd place finish enabled them to avoid a first round matchup with Bobby Hull's powerful Winnipeg Jets and earned them a series with the 2nd place Houston Aeros, who finished 2 points ahead of the Sharks in the standings.

After opening in Houston with an uninspired 7–2 loss, the Sharks bounced back to win game two by a 4–2 score. Heading back to L.A. with a split, the Sharks won a thrilling game three by a score of 3–2; goalie Russ Gillow made several spectacular saves to preserve the win. The turning point was game four. The clubs battled through regulation tied at 2; if the Sharks scored the next goal, they would have a commanding 3–1 series lead but if Houston scored, the series would be tied going back to Houston. Winger Murray Hall scored for Houston, and the Sharks didn't win another game, losing game five 6–3 and game six, 3–2. After the series, coach Terry Slater was criticized for starting George Gardner in games 1 and 5 despite the fact Gillow played better the second half of the season. Gardner was pulled in game 1 (a 7–2 loss) and did not play well in game 5 (a 6–3 loss). Garnder's GAA for the series was 5.69 while Gillow's was 2.91. Slater stated he wanted the veteran Gardner to start game 1 over the rookie Gillow.

Houston Aeros 4, Los Angeles Sharks 2 - Semifinals

Player stats

Note: Pos = Position; GP = Games played; G = Goals; A = Assists; Pts = Points; +/- = plus/minus; PIM = Penalty minutes; PPG = Power-play goals; SHG = Short-handed goals; GWG = Game-winning goals
      MIN = Minutes played; W = Wins; L = Losses; T = Ties; GA = Goals-against; GAA = Goals-against average; SO = Shutouts;

Awards and records

Transactions

Draft picks
3rd round, 8th pick (32nd overall pick) – Robert Klein, D – Kamloops

Farm teams

See also
1972–73 WHA season

References

External links

Los Angeles Sharks seasons
Los
Los